Solo is the fifth album by Austrian pop rock band Opus. It was released in 1985. It peaked at #8 on the Ö3 Austria Top 40 Longplay. The first single "Rock on the Rocks", peaked at #21 on the Ö3-Hitparade. The second single, "Idolater", peaked at #24 on the Ö3-Hitparade.

Track listing

References

Opus (Austrian band) albums
1985 albums
Polydor Records albums